The Halloren Chocolate Factory is the oldest German chocolate factory. The first mention of the firm dates back to 1804. The firm was founded in Halle, Saxony-Anhalt where its headquarters are today. In 1851 the company was named Friedrich David & Söhne. In the year 1905 the company was transformed into a shareholder company; thus the company name being altered to David Söhne AG accordingly. Another name change in 1933 made it Mignon Schokoladenwerke AG and since 1952 it is known by its current name Halloren.

Its most famous products are the "Halloren-Kugeln", or Halloren globes, which receive their name from the early salt workers, the "Halloren", whose festive dress has ball-shaped buttons which the chocolates resemble. The brand was especially popular in the former German Democratic Republic and remained popular after reunification.

In 2013, the company secured a majority share in the Belgian chocolate producer Bouchard.

The factory also features the Halloren Schokoladenmuseum (Halloren Chocolate Museum), which includes exhibits about the history of chocolate, chocolate making equipment, molds, and a view of the factory process.

References

External links

 Official site of the firm in English 
 Halloren Schokoladenmuseum  - in German
 

Buildings and structures in Halle (Saale)
German chocolate companies
Museums in Saxony-Anhalt
Chocolate museums
Food museums in Germany
Companies based in Halle (Saale)
Chocolate factories